Mr. and Mrs. America was a propaganda short produced by the US Department of Treasury in 1945 to urge citizens to buy and keep war bonds.

Mr. and Mrs. America contains a series of pre-taped messages from leading figures in American life, including Franklin D. Roosevelt, the presidents of the AFL, CIO, US Chamber of Commerce, and Secretary of the Treasury Henry Morgenthau, Jr. In between these messages there are montages of various battle scenes, dead enemy soldiers, and wounded GIs. After the president of the Chamber of Commerce's message, there is a more optimistic montage of life in America after the war and a series of vignettes in which a cross section of the US population - a young woman, middle aged immigrant industrial worker, an African-American man, an elderly Admiral, etc. - explain what they will do with their bonds once the war is over, such as start a business or send their children to school. The film ends with an American GI (portrayed by Eddie Albert) asking the audience to buy bonds.

See also 
List of Allied propaganda films of World War II
United States home front during World War II

External links 
 

1945 films
American World War II propaganda shorts
American black-and-white films
American short documentary films
1940s short documentary films
American war films
1940s war films
Black-and-white documentary films
1940s American films